Iveta Miculyčová (born 15 September 2005) is a Czech BMX cyclist. In 2022 she became the European Champion in Freestyle Park and won the bronze medal at the 2022 World Championships.

Early life
Miculyčová is from Kostelec nad Orlicí in the Hradec Králové Region of the Czech Republic. In 2018 a skatepark was built in her hometown and her parents bought her a BMX for Christmas. She also played football and made it to the under-15 national team and received an offer to play from Sparta Prague but her mother preferred her to stay at home and finish her education.

Career
Miculyčová became the first Czech rider to complete a back flip in competition. She won the 2022 European BMX Championships in Munich, Germany, in August 2022, triumphing over a field that included Olympic medalists Charlotte Worthington and Nikita Ducarroz. This win came about despite Miculyčová suffering a hematoma in her thigh which hampered her later runs in the competition. She followed this up with bronze at the 2022 UCI Urban Cycling World Championships held in Abu Dhabi.

References

2005 births
Living people
BMX riders
Czech female cyclists
European Games competitors for the Czech Republic